90 Squadron or 90th Squadron may refer to:

 No. 90 Squadron RAF, a unit of the British Royal Air Force 
 90th Fighter Squadron, a unit of the United States Air Force 
 90th Cyber Operations Squadron, a unit of the United States Air Force

See also
 90th Division (disambiguation)
 90th Regiment (disambiguation)